Njoko is a village in the Bamingui-Bangoran prefecture in the northern Central African Republic.

It lies on the border with Chad.

Populated places in Bamingui-Bangoran
N'Délé
Central African Republic–Chad border crossings